KACL (98.7 MHz, "Cool 98.7") is an FM radio station in Bismarck, North Dakota, owned by Townsquare Media airing a classic hits format competing against Radio Bismarck-Mandan's KXRV "Mojo 107.5". The station signed on in 1997 and has never changed its format, although it shifted from 1960s and 1970s music based oldies to 1970s and 1980s based classic hits in 2009.

Townsquare Media also owns KLXX 1270 (Talk), KBYZ 96.5 (Classic rock), KKCT 97.5 (Top 40), and KUSB 103.3 (Country) in the Bismarck-Mandan area. All the studios are at 4303 Memorial Highway in Mandan, along with the AM transmitter and tower. All the FM transmitters are at a site in Saint Anthony, North Dakota, on 57th Road.

On December 15, 2009 KACL was granted a U.S. Federal Communications Commission construction permit to increase the HAAT to 305.2 meters. It expired on December 15, 2012.

External links
Cool 98.7 website

ACL
Classic hits radio stations in the United States
Radio stations established in 1997
Townsquare Media radio stations